Onuah Elizabeth (born September 20, 1995) is a female Nigerian weightlifter. She won two gold medals in clean and jerk and snatch lifts after she made her debut representing Nigeria at the 2015 All-Africa Games in Congo Brazzaville.

References

1995 births
Living people
People from Edo State
Nigerian female weightlifters
Competitors at the 2015 African Games
African Games competitors for Nigeria
20th-century Nigerian women
21st-century Nigerian women